The 2010 Peterborough City Council election took place on 6 May 2010 to elect members of Peterborough City Council in England. This was on the same day as other local elections.

Election result

References

2010
2000s in Cambridgeshire
Peterborough